is a platforming video game developed by Tose and published by Nintendo for the Game Boy Advance only in Japan on August 5, 2004. It is the third game in The Legendary Starfy series, as well as the third and last title of the series developed and released for the Game Boy Advance. Later, its sequel, Densetsu no Stafy 4, was developed for the Nintendo DS.

Plot 
In the beginning, a short time after Densetsu no Stafy 2s storyline, everything was calm and everyone, including the protagonist Stafy, known as Starfy in Western regions, was happy again, until another severe thunderstorm came and shook Pufftop Palace.  This time, it was more severe than the ones in the past.  A lightning bolt struck the Magic Jar and destroyed it, and the antagonist of the previous titles, Ogura, was freed once again.  He later flew away from Pufftop Palace, leaving everyone else wondering what he was leaving for.  Starfy's father told Starfy and Moe that it fell to them to stop Ogura for a third time. Moe became angry and refused, because he was bored of doing the same things they did in the past.  Later, Starfy's sister, Starly, jumped and bounced on Moe, and introduced herself to him.  She later pushed him and her brother off the edge of Pufftop Palace and jumped down with them to pursue Ogura.

Gameplay 

Like its predecessors, Densetsu no Stafy 3 plays very much like other platforming games, such as some Super Mario Bros. titles and some Kirby titles, but it's mostly about swimming around stages, which makes this series' official game genre as marine platform. In fact, the colorful graphics and level layouts (as well as the look of Stafy) have drawn many comparisons to the Kirby series. Stafy himself can run, jump, and attack via spinning; he also gains access to various transportation objects and animal familiars as the games progress. Like Densetsu no Stafy 2 and unlike the first title of the series, Densetsu no Stafy 3 usually has a certain number of stages per area, with each stage split up into four sub-stages. Most of the other stages' goals are centered around retrieving a lost or stolen item for another character. There are many items to collect and many enemies to defeat. You can move Starfy on land by running and jumping, but when Starfy is in watery areas, you can move him much more freely, make him push obstacles, and so on. Like the previous games, this game also includes minigames, except all of them are different compared to the ones that are similar to Atari's Breakout.

Development 
After the release of Densetsu no Stafy 2, Nintendo and Tose immediately moved on to develop Densetsu no Stafy 3. It took less than a year for Nintendo and Tose to develop and release it. This time, the game was made with some features that the previous games didn't have, like multiplayer minigames for example. However, like its predecessors, Nintendo and TOSE aired animated television commercials for Densetsu no Stafy 3, as well as releasing some promotional merchandise. Perfume, a J-Pop group, recorded and played their own version of The Legendary Starfy main theme during the credits of a Japanese television show Oha-Sta. Despite that being made, it wasn't released in retail stores.

Reception 
Densetsu no Stafy 3 was the second best-selling game in Japan during its week of release at 42,000 copies. By the end of 2004, the game sold a total of 212,946 copies in the country. Japanese gaming publication Famitsu gave the game a total score of 31 out of 40.

Notes

References

External links 
  
Legendary Starfy 3 at NinDB

2004 video games
Game Boy Advance games
Game Boy Advance-only games
Japan-exclusive video games
Platform games
Tose (company) games
Video games developed in Japan
Video games set on fictional planets
Video games with underwater settings
The Legendary Starfy